Schenck Peak is a peak (about 500 m) in the Desko Mountains, located 2 nautical miles (3.7 km) southwest of Morrill Peak in southeast Rothschild Island. Named by Advisory Committee on Antarctic Names (US-ACAN) for Commander James N. Schenck, USCG, Executive Officer of USCGC Staten Island during U.S. Navy Operation Deepfreeze, 1971.

Mountains of Palmer Land